David Prescott (born 11 May 1937) is a former  Australian rules footballer who played with St Kilda in the Victorian Football League (VFL).

Notes

External links 

Living people
1937 births
Australian rules footballers from Victoria (Australia)
St Kilda Football Club players